CoveritLive is a social media platform that lets brands, media companies, individuals and small organizations share real, virtual and hybrid events online. CoveritLive can provide a "second screen" experience for televised events, or it can serve as the primary coverage of a sports, news or entertainment event. It can also provide live social streams and social walls. It was founded by Keith McSpurren who also co-founded Salesdriver.com with Joel Silver. CoveritLive ceased its service offering effective December 31, 2018.

Company history
In January 2009, CoveritLive secured $1 million in a first round of funding (from seed investor Flagstone Capital and private investor Paul Kedrosky). In August 2009, California-based Demand Media made a strategic investment and acquired a minority stake in CoveritLive; Demand Media said it would offer services to customers of its Pluck enterprise social media platform, which include Sky News, NPR, USA Today and the NFL. In February 2011, CoveritLive was acquired by Demand Media for an undisclosed sum.<ref>Demand Media acquires blogging tool CoverItLive - CNET.com"" - http://news.cnet.com/8301-13577_3-20038726-36.html</ref>

CoveritLive has been used to cover events including the May 2010 UK General Election, the NFL Draft, American Idol, the Tour de France and other cycling events (via Velo News) and the 2010 FIFA World Cup (during which it claimed 146 million page views in 30 days).

The service crashed temporarily during 27 January 2010 due to a massive surge of interest in journalists' feeds using CoverItLive to report Steve Jobs' keynote at Apple's launch of its iPad device. Online publications using CoveritLive for this event included MacWorld and MacNN''. CoverItLive VP/GM Ben Schneider said in December 2013 that over 50 million unique visitors attend CoverItLive experiences per month averaging over 40 minutes per-visit.

Brands and media companies that use CoverItLive include Bild, Frito Lay, Gannett, LeMonde, Marvel, the NBA, the NFL, People, SiriusXM, SONOS, Weather Channel, WWE and Yahoo!. CoveritLive has powered coverage of events including the 2014 Crimean crisis, the NFL Draft, and the Academy Awards.

Service features
CoveritLive offers several experience formats including Live Content Walls, Live Scoreboards, Live Blogs, Live Chat, Second Screen and Live Q&A. Back-end management and curation allow Question and Comment Moderation; Twitter, Instagram, Facebook and YouTube content filtration and integration, Media Libraries, Quick Polls, Video, and Native Images. The platform includes Panelist/Producer Tools, Custom Templates & Branding and Real-Time Analytics. CoveritLive Premium includes all Basic version features plus enterprise administrative tools and custom skinning.

References

External links
 CoveritLive.com

Social media companies of the United States